The Japanese leaf warbler (Phylloscopus xanthodryas) is a leaf warbler (family Phylloscopidae). The species was first described by Robert Swinhoe in 1863. It was formerly included in the "Old World warbler" assemblage. It is closely related to the Arctic warbler and the Kamchatka leaf warbler, to which it was formerly considered conspecific.

It is found throughout Japan, except on Hokkaido; it winters to Southeast Asia.

References

External links 
eBird website

Japanese leaf warbler
Birds of Japan
Japanese leaf warbler